Air transportation in Armenia is the most convenient and comfortable means of getting into the country. There are large international airports that accept both external and domestic flights throughout the Republic. As of 2020, 11 airports operate in Armenia, however, only Yerevan's Zvartnots International Airport and Gyumri's Shirak Airport are in use for commercial aviation. There are 3 airports additionally under reconstruction in Armenia, once completed they will be used for commercial and civil aviation, including Syunik Airport, Stepanavan Airport and Goris Airport. Statistics show that the number of passengers arriving in the country by air transportation increases yearly.

In graph

Armenia's airports by passenger traffic in 2020(Feb 29)

Armenia's airports by passenger traffic in 2019

Armenia's airports by passenger traffic in 2018

Armenia's airports by passenger traffic in 2017

Armenia's airports by passenger traffic in 2016

See also

Transport in Armenia
List of airports in Armenia
List of the busiest airports in the former USSR

References

Armenia
Armenia